Ekmat (meaning "Agreed upon" in Marathi) is a Marathi-language daily newspaper by "Indo Enterprises Pvt. Ltd." Headquartered in Latur, Maharashtra, India. Ekmat is the flagship newspaper of the foundation publication, Indo Enterprises Pvt. Ltd.

It is published in Marathwada and Solapur.

Product
The newspaper focuses on politics and gave prominence to civil issue and the students' need. Catering to its young audience, it started using common terms in its articles like world, sport, education, etc. Ekmat has seen a new phase in its layout style. This new-looking newspaper was made to cater to the needs of its readers. Also having supplement like My Latur shows that it has under-hood its audience and is here satisfy them to the fullest.

Saptarang offers Sunday Specials in the form of stories, articles and comprehensive coverage of latest happenings in the society with analysis and opinions from renowned experts from their respective fields.

Sakshi is a ladies/women’s supplement who is their true friend, adviser and a source of trustworthy information. Sakshi a Tuesday supplement addresses the reading needs of ladies/women on a relaxed to the fullest.

The Ekmat Diwali Ank is the yearly Special Ank from Ekmat. This Ank is a collector’s issue covering various topics like politics, entertainment, sports, health, fitness, etc. written by eminent Marathi writers and intelligentsia.

Sections and features

Main Sections - Local, Maharashtra, National, International, Agriculture, Sports. These sections are covered in every day all editions of Ekmat. Besides the above, there are some special sections, which only appear in certain edition or on certain days.

Ekmat is well known for providing readers with host of value added supplement and editorial specials.

They are as follows -

Spandan -
"Seven days a week", the supplement that covers local news and events of the city. Ekmathas 7 city supplements catering to various cities/regions across Maharashtra. These city supplements feature latest happenings and events of the city along with business and entertainment stories.

Monday - "Arth Jagatach Spandan", Focusing on in-depth business and financial news, Arth Jagatach Spandan is special of Ekmat, it dedicated to investments helping readers with tips on how to make the most their money. Arth Jagatach Spandan is dedicated to personal finance with colorful charts, graphs, tables and analysis explaining complex financial terminology in simple detail.

Tuesday - "Krushi Spandan"

Wednesday - "Health Spandan"

Thursday - "Yuva Spandan"

Friday - "Krida Spandan"

Saturday - "Career Spandan"
A Special supplement that guides youth on various Education & Career opportunities available to them Career Spandan provides students with comprehensive knowledge of procedures and processes of various competitive exams and career building prospects in diverse fields from Agriculture to Information Technology (IT).

Sunday - "Manoranjan Spandan"

External links
Ekmat official site
Bade Achhe Lagte Hain
Marathi Newspaper Circulation

Marathi-language newspapers
Latur district
Latur
Newspapers published in Maharashtra
Marathwada
Publications with year of establishment missing